Amblyseius neorykei is a species of mite in the family Phytoseiidae.

References

neorykei
Articles created by Qbugbot
Animals described in 1977